Mukesh Rajput is an Indian politician and a second time elected Member of the Pariliament of India in 17thLok Sabha, representing the Farrukhabad constituency. Prior to this he was elected to 16th Lok Sabha (2014-2019) from the same constituency. He belongs to Bhartiya Janata Party.

Early life and education

Mukesh Rajput was born on 8 August 1968 to Shri Lajjaram and Smt. Chandawati. He was born in Farrukhabad, a city in the state of Uttar Pradesh. He completed his Bachelor of Science (B.Sc.) degree from R.P. Degree College, Kamalganj, Farrukhabad, Uttar Pradesh. He married Saubhagyawati on 10 June 1980.

References

Living people
India MPs 2014–2019
Lok Sabha members from Uttar Pradesh
People from Farrukhabad district
Bharatiya Janata Party politicians from Uttar Pradesh
1968 births
India MPs 2019–present